Terry Dale Crosby (born January 4, 1957, in Toledo, Ohio) is an American former professional basketball player.

Born (ABA) and a 1975 graduate of DeVilbiss High School, he was selected by the Kansas City Kings in the 18th pick of the third round in the 1979 NBA draft out of the University of Tennessee. He also went on to have a very successful career in England and Europe.

External links
NBA stats @ basketballreference.com

1957 births
Living people
American men's basketball players
Basketball players from Ohio
Kansas City Kings draft picks
Kansas City Kings players
Parade High School All-Americans (boys' basketball)
Point guards
Sportspeople from Toledo, Ohio
Tennessee Volunteers basketball players